Aron may refer to:

Characters
Aron (comics), from the Marvel Universe comic Aron! HyperSpace Boy!
Aron (Pokémon), in the Pokémon franchise
Aron Trask, from John Steinbeck's novel East of Eden
Áron or Aaron, the brother of Moses

People
Aron (name), name origin, variants, people

Geography
Aron (Loire), a river in central France
Aron (Mayenne), a tributary of the Mayenne in northwestern France
Aron, Mayenne, a commune in northwestern France
Aron, India, a town and nagar panchayat (settlement transitioning from rural to urban)

See also
Aaron (disambiguation)
Aarons (disambiguation)
Fanum d'Aron, a Romano-Celtic temple in Aurillac, Auvergne, France